The 2012 Women's World Open Squash Championship is the women's edition of the 2012 World Open, which serves as the individual world championship for squash players. The event took place in Grand Cayman in Cayman Island from 16 to 21 December. Nicol David won her seventh World Open title, beating Laura Massaro in the final.

Prize money and ranking points
For 2012, the prize purse was $188,000. The prize money and points breakdown is as follows:

Seeds

Draw and results

See also
World Open
2012 Men's World Open Squash Championship
2012 Women's World Team Squash Championships

References

External links
WISPA World Open 2012 website
Worldopensquash.com

World Squash Championships
W
2012 in Caymanian sport
Squash in the Cayman Islands
2012 in women's squash
International sports competitions hosted by the Cayman Islands